The 1979 Limerick Senior Hurling Championship was the 85th staging of the Limerick Senior Hurling Championship since its establishment by the Limerick County Board.

South Liberties were the defending champions.

On 23 September 1979, Patrickswell won the championship after a 2-16 to 0-16 defeat of Tournafulla in the final. It was their sixth championship title overall and their first title in two championship seasons.

Results

Final

References

Limerick Senior Hurling Championship
Limerick Senior Hurling Championship